Shchuchye is a town and the administrative center of Shchuchansky District in Kurgan Oblast, Russia, located on Lake Shchuchye,  west of Kurgan, the administrative center of the oblast. Population:

History
It has been known since 1750 as a selo and was granted town status in 1945.

Administrative and municipal status
Within the framework of administrative divisions, Shchuchye serves as the administrative center of Shchuchansky District. As an administrative division, it is incorporated within Shchuchansky District as Shchuchye Town Under District Jurisdiction. As a municipal division, Shchuchye Town Under District Jurisdiction is incorporated within Shchuchansky Municipal District as Shchuchye Urban Settlement.

Military
About 14% of Russian chemical weapons were stored at Shchuchye. However under the Chemical Weapons Convention a new facility to destroy these chemical weapons was opened there in May 2009, with the financial help of the United Kingdom, Sweden and the Czech Republic,  as well as the US-supported Nunn-Lugar program. The destruction and decontamination of the Shchuchye stockpile was completed in 2015.

References

Notes

Sources

Cities and towns in Kurgan Oblast